Ariel is a suborbital launch vehicle being developed by Australian private space company Gilmour Space Technologies, for use as a sounding rocket. The vehicle has been developed to demonstrate and test the company's numerous technologies. The rocket serves as a part of for the company's preparation orbital spaceflight capabilities after 2020.

One Vision
On February 1, 2019, Gilmour revealed "One Vision", the first Ariel-class rocket to be constructed. The original launch date was set for late February, however, this was pushed back to "sometime in March". The main purpose of One Vision is to test the G-70 hybrid rocket motor, before it is used for commercial launches in 2020. One Vision will be launched from a custom-made mobile launch facility, which is the first of its kind built in Australia and should Ariel-class rockets be launched from it, would have the largest commercial launch capacity in the world.

References

Sounding rockets of Australia